Vito Fabris (20 September 1954 – 10 April 2021) was an Italian basketball player. Nicknamed La Cavalla, he played several seasons in his native country, including in the top-tier Lega Basket Serie A.

Death
Fabris died on 10 April 2021 while waiting on a heart transplant.

References

1954 births
2021 deaths
Italian basketball players
Sportspeople from the Province of Forlì-Cesena